The Ogden Mustangs are a junior ice hockey team based in Ogden, Utah.  The Mustangs are members of the United States Premier Hockey League (USPHL) and play their home games at The Ice Sheet at Ogden. Before joining the USPHL in 2020, the Mustangs and its predecessors were longtime members of the Western States Hockey League (WSHL).

History 
David and Lori Miller originally purchased the Bakersfield Jr. Condors franchise in 2009 as a member of the Western States Hockey League (WSHL). Prior to purchasing the team, Lori Miller acted as the director of youth hockey for Kern County hockey clubs for nine years. Outside of hockey, the Millers own an oil well welding and a construction company based in California. The team relocated from Bakersfield, California, in the summer of 2011, and became the Ogden Mustangs. The Weber County Ice Sheet, located on the campus of Weber State University, was one of several host venues for the 2002 Winter Olympics. As a result, many upgrades and amenities have been added and was one of the deciding factors in the relocation of the team. They are the second junior team to play in Ogden, the first was the Ogden Blades, who played the 1993–94 season in the American Frontier Hockey League.

In 2020, the Mustangs left the WSHL and joined the Premier Division of the United States Premier Hockey League (USPHL), another independent junior hockey league. The Miller family then sold the team to Sean and Kimberly Wilmert.

Season-by-season records
Note: GP = Games played, W = Wins, L = Losses, T = Ties, OTL = Overtime losses, Pts = Points, GF = Goals for, GA = Goals against, PIM = Penalties in minutes

References

External links
 Ogden Mustangs Official Site

Sports in Ogden, Utah
Ice hockey teams in Utah
Ice hockey clubs established in 2011
2011 establishments in Utah